Honoré de Balzac (1799–1850) was a French novelist and playwright.

Balzac may also refer to:

Astronomy
 Balzac (crater), a crater on Mercury
 18430 Balzac, an asteroid

Places
 Balzac, Alberta, Canada
 Balzac, Charente, France
 Balzac, Colorado, United States

Music
 Balzac (band), a Japanese punk band

People

People with the surname
 Jean-Louis Guez de Balzac (1597–1654), French author
 Catherine Henriette de Balzac d'Entragues (1579–1633), mistress to Henry IV of France
 Jesús M. Balzac, plaintiff in Balzac v. Porto Rico

Other people
 Federico Balzaretti, also known as Balzac, Italian footballer

Other uses
 Le Balzac, a cinema in Paris

See also
 Balsac (disambiguation)
 Balzac Billy, Groundhog Day prognosticator
 Balzac blanc, French wine grape variety
 Mourvèdre, or Balzac noir, another grape variety
 Dassault Balzac V, a jet fighter prototype of the 1960s